Tanglewood Tree is a 2000 album by American folk duo Dave Carter and Tracy Grammer.

Track listing 
All songs written by Dave Carter.
 "Happytown (All Right with Me)" – 3:34 
 "Tanglewood Tree" – 3:42 
 "The Mountain" – 3:39 
 "Farewell to Saint Dolores" – 4:29 
 "Hey Conductor" – 3:20 
 "Crocodile Man" – 3:02 
 "Walkin' Away from Caroline" – 5:09 
 "Farewell to Fiddler's Rim" – 2:12 
 "Cat-Eye Willie Claims His Lover" – 4:06 
 "Cowboy Singer" – 3:44 
 "Farewell to Bitterroot Valley" – 2:37

Credits 

Produced by Dave Carter & Tracy Grammer.

 Dave Carter: guitar, banjo, piano, Hammond organ, vocals
 Tracy Grammer: guitar, violin, mandolin, vocals
 Lorne Entress: drums and percussion
 Bob Dick: upright bass
 Richard Gates: electric bass
 Roger Williams: Dobro guitar
 Chris Turner: harmonica

External links 
 Music page at the official Tracy Grammer web site (lyrics and sound samples)

Notes and sources 

2000 albums
Dave Carter and Tracy Grammer albums
Tracy Grammer albums